Gaddi may refer to:
Gaddi people, a tribe living in the Indian state of Himachal Pradesh.
Muslim Gaddi, a tribe found in North India and Pakistan
Gaddi language, a language of India
Gaddi (name), a list of people with the name
Gaddi (sheep), a breed of sheep from India
Gaddi (biblical figure), one of the scouts sent by Moses into the Land of Canaan

See also
Gadi (disambiguation)
Gaddis (surname)
Gaddi Torso, a Hellenistic sculpture of the 2nd century BCE